Death from the Skies!: These Are The Ways The World Will End is a book by the American astronomer Phil Plait, also known as "the Bad Astronomer". The book was published in 2008 and explores the various ways in which the human race could be rendered extinct by astronomical phenomena.

Background
The author stated during an interview that one of the reasons for writing the book was that "the Universe is incredibly inhospitable, yet we have this planet that's doing OK by us. Another is that the Universe is incredibly cool and interesting. Black holes are really fun to think about. Actually, most of this is mind-stretching and fun. What happens to the Sun after 100 quadrillion years? One hundred octillion? A googol?" He also said that the reason for using doomsday scenarios was to take a scientific viewpoint, make it like a roller coaster or horror movie to make it fun and exciting. The stories were not to scare people out of their pants but make it cool to read about it.

Some of the subjects discussed in the book

Reviews
The book has had positive reviews from Todd Dailey of Wired Magazine, Nancy Atkinson of Universe Today, 
and Rebecca Watson from Skepchick. It was also reviewed for Smithsonian magazine by Sarah Zielinski.

Appearances in Other Media
In 2010 the Discovery Channel had a documentary called Phil Plait's Bad Universe.  This show was based on a few chapters of the book.   George Hrab and Phil Plait recorded a song called "Death from the Skies" whose lyrics is based on some of the events covered in the book.

References

External links

Press interviews
 Astronomy Cast Podcast Interview
 Paul Harris Radio Interview
  TalkingHeadTV interview

Other
 Bad Astronomy, Plait's blog as of February 2017 (Syfy.com)
 Bad Astronomy, Plait's personal blog archive (Slate.com)

Astronomy books
Cosmic doomsday
Popular science books
2008 non-fiction books